American Ghosts and Old World Wonders is a posthumously published anthology of short fiction by Angela Carter. It was first published in the United Kingdom in 1993 by Chatto & Windus Ltd. and contains a collection of nine stories, one half of which deal with American folklore and the other with older myths and fairytales. It is introduced by Susannah Clapp.

The book is divided into two parts, the first (concerned with America) consists of "Lizzie's Tiger", "John Ford's 'Tis Pity She's a Whore", "Gun for the Devil" and "The Merchant of Shadows". 

Part two (concerned with Europe: the "Old World") contains "The Ghost Ships", "In Pantoland", "Ashputtle or The Mother's Ghost", "Alice in Prague or The Curious Room" and "Impressions: The Wrightsman Magdalene".

The anthology's contents are also reprinted in the volume Burning Your Boats, which features all of Carter's short fiction.

Short story collections by Angela Carter
Books published posthumously
1993 short story collections
Chatto & Windus books